Esther Fuchs (born 1953) is an Israeli Jewish feminist biblical scholar. Fuchs is Professor of Near Eastern Studies and Judaic Studies at the University of Arizona.

Biography
Esther Fuchs was born in Tel Aviv and studied at the Hebrew University of Jerusalem and Brandeis University. She taught at the University of Texas at Austin before moving to the University of Arizona.

Fuchs is the author of Israeli Mythogynies: Women in Contemporary Hebrew Fiction (1987) and Sexual Politics in the Biblical Narrative (2000). She describes her work as an attempt to "depatriarchalize" the Hebrew Bible.

Selected works
 Encounters with Israeli authors, 1982
 Omanut ha-hitamemut : ʻal ha-ironyah shel Shai ʻAgnon, 1985
 Israeli mythogynies : women in contemporary Hebrew fiction, 1987
 Sexual politics in the biblical narrative : reading the Hebrew Bible as a woman, 1989
 Women and the Holocaust : narrative and representation, 1999
 On the cutting edge : the study of women in biblical worlds : essays in honor of Elisabeth Schüssler Fiorenza, 2003
 Feminist theory and the Bible : interrogating the sources, 2016
 Jewish feminism : framed and reframed, 2018

Notes

References

1953 births
Brandeis University alumni
Feminist biblical scholars
Female biblical scholars
Hebrew University of Jerusalem alumni
Israeli Jews
Jewish biblical scholars
Jewish feminists
Judaic scholars
Living people
People from Tel Aviv
University of Arizona faculty
University of Texas at Austin faculty
20th-century Jewish biblical scholars
21st-century Jewish biblical scholars